See also Horkeliella (false horkelias).

Horkelia is a genus of plants in the rose family. It includes several species of plants known commonly as horkelias. These are flowering plants closely related to the cinquefoils (Potentilla) and sometimes considered part of the same genus. There are nineteen species found in western North America, especially California. Horkelia was named for German scientist Johann Horkel.

Species:
Horkelia bolanderi – border horkelia
Horkelia californica – California horkelia
Horkelia clevelandii – Cleveland's horkelia
Horkelia congesta – Sierra horkelia
Horkelia cuneata – wedgeleaf horkelia
Horkelia daucifolia – carrotleaf horkelia
Horkelia fusca – dusky horkelia, pinewoods horkelia
Horkelia hendersonii – Henderson's horkelia
Horkelia hispidula – White Mountain horkelia
Horkelia howellii – Howell's horkelia
Horkelia marinensis – Point Reyes horkelia
Horkelia parryi – Parry's horkelia
Horkelia rydbergii – Rydberg's horkelia
Horkelia sericata – silky horkelia
Horkelia tenuiloba – Santa Rosa horkelia
Horkelia tridentata – threetooth horkelia
Horkelia truncata – Ramona horkelia
Horkelia tularensis – Kern Plateau horkelia
Horkelia wilderae – Barton Flats horkelia
Horkelia yadonii – Santa Lucia horkelia

 
Potentilleae
Rosaceae genera